Brenda Anne Marie Schultz-McCarthy (born 28 December 1970) is a former Dutch tennis player. Primarily known by her maiden name Brenda Schultz, she married Sean McCarthy, a former American football player at University of Cincinnati, on 8 April 1995 and took his name. Schultz is known for her fast serve; she has the eighth-fastest serve ever recorded by a female tennis player.

Tennis career 
Schultz' career high was in 1996 when she reached World No. 9. She reached the quarterfinals at Wimbledon and the US Open in 1995. She retired from tennis in 1999 with longstanding injuries. She came out of retirement in 2005, playing Fed Cup and WTA tournaments in 2006. The best result of her comeback came in June 2006 at the Tier III Ordina Open in the Netherlands, reaching the quarterfinals with wins over two players ranked in the top 70 on the WTA Tour.

In July 2006, Schultz-McCarthy claimed her place as the fastest server in WTA history, recording a 130 mph (209 km/h) serve in the first round of the Western & Southern Financial Group Women's Open qualifying tournament, held in Cincinnati, Ohio. Venus Williams previously held the women's record set in 1998 of 127 mph (204 km/h) in a match in a quarter-finals win against Mary Pierce in Zurich. Williams would tie the record in 2008. In June 2007, Schultz-McCarthy won an ITF tournament in Surbiton.

Grand Slam finals

Doubles: 1 (0–1)

Mixed doubles: 1 (0–1)

WTA career finals

Singles (7 wins, 9 losses)

Doubles (9 wins - 10 losses)

ITF finals

Singles (3–2)

Doubles (1–1)

Grand Slam singles performance timeline

See also
 Fastest recorded tennis serves

References

External links
 
 
 
 Brenda Shultz-McCarthy Tennis and Adventure Camp

1970 births
Dutch female tennis players
Hopman Cup competitors
Living people
Olympic tennis players of the Netherlands
Sportspeople from Haarlem
Tennis players at the 1992 Summer Olympics
Tennis players at the 1996 Summer Olympics
Wimbledon junior champions
Grand Slam (tennis) champions in girls' singles
People from Juno Beach, Florida
20th-century Dutch women
21st-century Dutch women